is a town located in Aomori Prefecture, Japan. ,  the town had an estimated population of 9,981 in 4960 households, and a population density of 50 persons per km2.

Geography
Nakadomari  is in Kitatsugaru District of Aomori Prefecture, and consists of two discontinuous geographic areas in northern Tsugaru Peninsula. The larger area is in the south, and consists of the former town of Nakasato. The smaller area is in the north, and consists of the former village of Kodomari with a coastline on the Sea of Japan at the western end of Tsugaru Strait. The Kodomari Dam is located in the town.

Neighboring municipalities
Aomori Prefecture
Goshogawara
Tsugaru
Yomogita
Sotogahama

Climate
Nakadomari has a cold humid continental climate (Köppen Cfa) characterized by warm short summers and long cold winters with heavy snowfall. The average annual temperature in Nakadomari is 9.4 °C. The average annual rainfall is 1399 mm with September as the wettest month. The temperatures are highest on average in August, at around 22.3 °C, and lowest in January, at around -2.3 °C. Snowfall typically begins in late November and lasts through March and sometimes April. Blizzard-like conditions, created by strong winds and a heavy accumulation of snow, are common during winter. During these times visibility can be reduced to several feet or less.

Demographics
Per Japanese census data, the population of Nakadomari has peaked around the year 1960 and has decreased steadily since. It is now less than it was  century ago.

History
The area around Nakadomari was controlled by the Tsugaru clan of Hirosaki Domain during the Edo period. With the establishment of the modern municipalities system on April 1, 1889, the villages of Nakasato and Komadari were created within Kitatsugaru District, Aomori. Nakasato was raised to town status on September 10,1941. The town of Nakadomari was created on March 28, 2005 as a result of the merger of Nakasato with Komadari.

Government
Nakadomari has a mayor-council form of government with a directly elected mayor and a unicameral town legislature of 15 members.  Together with the city of Goshogawara, it contributes three members to the Aomori Prefectural Assembly. In terms of national politics, the town is part of Aomori 3rd district of the lower house of the Diet of Japan.

Economy

The economy of Nakadomari is heavily dependent on agriculture, forestry and commercial fishing.

Education
Nakasato has four public elementary schools (three in Nakasato and one in Kodomari) and two public junior high schools (one in Kodomari and one in Nakasato) operated by the town government. The town has one public high school, located in Nakasato, operated by the Aomori Prefectural Board of Education.

Transportation

Railway
 Tsugaru Railway 
  -  - ,

Highway

Local attractions
Lake Jūsan, National Historic Site

Culture 
Nakadomari has several yearly festivals including a firefly festival, summer festival and winter snow festival. The area is known locally for producing high quality blueberries and dried squid.

Noted people from Nakadomari
Takarafuji Daisuke,  sumo wrestler
Ōnoshō Fumiya, sumo wrestler
Kan Mikami,  folk singer

External links

 
Live Camera Feed of Nakadomari

References 

Towns in Aomori Prefecture
Populated coastal places in Japan